Wilno is the Polish name of the city of Vilnius, Lithuania.

Wilno may also refer to:

Wilno, Minnesota, United States
Wilno, Ontario,  Canada
No. 317 "City of Wilno" Polish Fighter Squadron

See also 
 Wilno Voivodeship (disambiguation)